25 Grandes Éxitos (English: 25 Greatest Hits) is a greatest hits album by Bachata singer Anthony Santos. It was released on November 4, 2014.

Track listing

Charts

References 

2014 greatest hits albums
2014 compilation albums
Antony Santos albums
Latin music albums
Spanish-language albums